Wiman-Valiron theory is a mathematical theory invented by Anders Wiman as a tool to study the behavior of
arbitrary entire functions. After the work of Wiman, the theory was developed by other mathematicians,
and extended to
more general classes of analytic functions. The main result of the theory is an asymptotic formula for the function
and its derivatives near the point where the maximum modulus of this function is attained.

Maximal term and central index

By definition, an entire function can be represented by a power series which is convergent for all complex :

Its modulus is called the maximal term of the series:

Here  is the exponent for which the maximum is attained; if there are several maximal terms, we define  as the
largest exponent of them.
and is called the central index.

Let

be the maximum modulus of the function . 
Cauchy's inequality implies that  for all .
The converse estimate  was first proved by Borel, and
a more precise estimate due to Wiman reads

inequality holds. In fact, it was shown by Valiron that the above relation holds for "most" values of : the exceptional set 
for which it does not hold has finite logarithmic measure:

Improvements of these inequality were subject of much research in the 20th century.

The main asymptotic formula

The following result of Wiman 
 is fundamental for various applications: let  be the point for which the maximum in
It turns
out that  behaves near the point  
like a monomial: 
there are arbitrarily large values of  such that the formula

holds in the disk

where  is the exceptional set described above. This disk is usually called the Wiman-Valiron disk.

Applications

This is useful for studies of entire solutions of differential equations.

Another important application is due to Valiron
 who noticed that the image of the Wiman-Valiron disk contains a "large" annulus ( where both  and 
are arbitrarily large). This implies the important theorem of Valiron that there are arbitrarily large discs in
the plane in which the inverse branches of an entire function can be defined. A quantitative version of this statement
is known as the Bloch theorem.

This theorem of Valiron has further applications in
holomorphic dynamics: it is used in the proof of the fact that the escaping set of an entire function is not empty.

Later development

In 1938, Macintyre 
 found that one can get rid of the central index and of power series itself in this theory.
Macintyre replaced the central index by the quantity

and proved the main relation in the form

This statement does not mention the power series, but the assumption that  is entire was used by Macintyre.

The final generalization was achieved by
Bergweiler, Rippon and Stallard

who showed that this relation persists for every unbounded analytic function  defined in an arbitrary unbounded region
The key statement which makes this generalization possible is that the Wiman-Valiron disk is actually contained in 
for all non-exceptional .

References